Bernhard Brinkmann (22 May 1952 – 7 December 2022) was a German politician and member of the SPD. He was a member of the Bundestag, the German federal parliament, from 1998, elected from the single member district of Hildesheim until 2013 and from the land list of Lower Saxony from then.

Brinkmann was born in Dinklar, Lower Saxony on 22 May 1952. He died on 7 December 2022, at the age of 70.

References

External links 
 Website from Bernhard Brinkmann
 Biography by German Bundestag

1952 births
2022 deaths
People from Hildesheim (district)
Members of the Bundestag for Lower Saxony
Members of the Bundestag 2009–2013
Members of the Bundestag 2005–2009
Members of the Bundestag 2002–2005
Members of the Bundestag 1998–2002
Members of the Bundestag for the Social Democratic Party of Germany